Eric Roberson (born September 27, 1976) is an American singer, songwriter, former rapper and music producer. He is sometimes referred to simply as Erro, the name which he later used as part of his label Blue Erro Soul. His first single, "Represent", was released through Warner Bros. Records in 1994 and he recorded an album for that label which remains unreleased.

Career
Raised in Rahway, New Jersey, Roberson attended Rahway High School.

He subsequently returned to Howard University to complete his studies in Musical Theatre. After performing in a number of musicals and plays, he landed a songwriting deal through the EMI label, and went on to collaborate with Philadelphia-based artists such as Jill Scott, Musiq Soulchild, and most extensively, DJ Jazzy Jeff.

As a member of Jeff's A Touch of Jazz production company, Roberson made contributions to Jeff's debut album, The Magnificent in 2002. He continued songwriting work as well as releasing his own material through his Blue Erro Soul imprint. He also appeared on DJ Spinna's Intergalactic Soul LP in 2006.

Roberson was nominated for two Grammys in the Best Urban/Alternative Performance category. He was nominated for two songs from his 2009 album Music Fan First- "A Tale of Two" in 2010 and "Still" in the same category a year later.

In 2013, he was a member of the band, United Tenors together with Dave Hollister, Fred Hammond and Brian Courtney Wilson.

Roberson's "I Have A Song" was chosen to be the fundraising single, produced by Jak Beula and released in February 2016, to enable the permanent installation of the first dedicated Commonwealth war memorial in the UK to African and Caribbean service men and women of both World Wars.

Studio albums

Live albums

Selected discography 
112 – Room 112 (1998), "Funny Feelings" (writer)
Wild Wild West (1999), Tra-Knox  "Lucky Day" (writer), Kel Spencer featuring Richie Sambora  "I'm Wanted" (background vocals), Neutral  "Chocolate Form" (writer)
Gina Thompson – If You Only Knew (1999), "Ya Di Ya" (writer), "Take My Number Down" (writer, background vocals)
Will Smith – Willennium (1999), "I'm Comin'" (vocal production)
Jill Scott – Who Is Jill Scott? Words and Sounds Vol. 1 (2000), "Getting In The Way" (background vocals)
Musiq Soulchild – Aijuswanaseing (2000), "Mary Go Round" (writer, vocal arrangements)
Will Downing – All the Man You Need (2000), "Thinkin' About You" (writer, background vocals)
Case – Open Letter (2001), "Driving" (writer, background vocals), "Love Of My Life" (writer), "Wishful Thinking" (writer)
Vivian Green – A Love Story (2002), "What Is Love?" (writer, background vocals), "Emotional Rollercoaster" (writer, background vocals), "Ain't Nothing But Love" (writer, background vocals)
Musiq Soulchild – Juslisen (2002), "Previouscats" (writer, background vocals)
Cam'ron – Come Home with Me (2002), "Tomorrow" (writer, uncredited background vocals)
Dwele – Subject (2003), "Hold On" (writer, background vocals, vocal production)
Carl Thomas – Let's Talk About It (2004), "Rebound" (writer, producer)
Charlie Wilson – Charlie, Last Name Wilson (2005), "Thru It All" (writer)
Phonte – Charity Starts at Home (2011), "Who Loves You More" (vocals)
The Foreign Exchange – Love in Flying Colors (2013), "Better" (vocals)
Robert Glasper – Black Radio 2 (2013), "Big Girl Body" (vocals)
Algebra Blessett – Recovery (2014), "Mystery" (writer)
Lil' John Roberts – The Heartbeat (2014), "Space" (vocals)
AverySunshine – Twenty Sixty Four (2017), "Heaven Is Right Here" (writer), "Twenty Sixty Four" (writer)
Phonte – No News Is Good News (2018), "Find That Love Again" (vocals)
Brandon Williams – The Love Factor (2019) "Don't Give Up on Love" (vocals)
Zo! – FourFront (2019) – "Love Up" (vocals)
Nao Yoshioka – Undeniable (2019) – "Invest in Me feat. Carolyn Malachi" (producer)

Compilations
"Couldn't Hear Me" appears on the compilation Gilles Peterson Worldwide Exclusives 3 (2004) Talking Loud.

Awards and nominations

References

External links

Official website
Eric Roberson UK Vibe Interview by Michael "The Dood" Edwards, 2011
Eric Roberson interview by Pete Lewis, Blues & Soul, September 2011
Eric Roberson interview by Pete Lewis, Blues & Soul, September 2009
Eric Roberson audio interview on HoneySoul.com
Eric Roberson interview by Pete Lewis, Blues & Soul, June 2008
Eric Roberson: ThaFormula.Com – Interview
Interview

Howard University alumni
Living people
People from Rahway, New Jersey
Rahway High School alumni
American neo soul singers
1976 births
American contemporary R&B singers
21st-century American singers